Paneer tikka is an Indian dish made from chunks of paneer marinated in spices and grilled in a tandoor. It is a vegetarian alternative to chicken tikka and other meat dishes. It is a popular dish that is widely available in India and countries with an Indian diaspora.

Preparation
Chunks of paneer, a type of fresh cheese, are marinated in spices and are then arranged on a stick with capsicums (bell peppers), onions and tomatoes. These sticks are grilled in a tandoor and the dish is thereafter served hot, seasoned with lemon juice and chaat masala. It is sometimes accompanied by salad or mint chutney. Tikka dishes traditionally go well with mint chutney. The paneer, though tender, has a crisp singe on the surface.

Variations

When paneer tikka is served with a sauce, it is called paneer tikka masala. It is also served as with a wrap, paneer tikka roll, where the paneer tikka is wrapped into an Indian bread and served. A variant of paneer tikka is also made as a kebab.

Over the years, there have been several variations, such as Kashmiri paneer tikka, where the paneer is stuffed with chopped almonds and grilled, a variety of Chinese food, paneer tikka masala chow mein, and dosa stuffed with paneer tikka.

International fast food chains in India have also incorporated paneer tikka into their menus, such as Pizza Hut and Domino's which offer a paneer tikka topping on their pizzas, whereas Subway offers a paneer tikka sandwich and McDonald's has a paneer tikka wrap on its menu. ITC's Bingo brand of potato chips has experimented with a paneer tikka flavour of chips. Prior to that, in 2003, Nestle's Maggi experimented with a ready to cook variety of paneer tikka. Other companies also offer spice mixes and ready-to-eat variants of paneer tikka.

Gallery

See also

References

Punjabi cuisine
Indian cheese dishes